Taddeo Gaddi (c. 1290, in Florence – 1366, in Florence) was a medieval Italian painter and architect.

He was the son of Gaddo di Zanobi, called Gaddo Gaddi. He was a member of Giotto's workshop from 1313 until the master's death in 1337. According to Giorgio Vasari, he was considered Giotto's most talented pupil: in 1347 he was placed at the top in a list of Florence's most renowned painters. He also traded as a merchant, and had a branch establishment in Venice. As well as a painter, he was a mosaicist and architect.

His main work is the cycle of Stories of the Virgin in the Baroncelli Chapel of the Basilica of Santa Croce in Florence (1328–1338). Later he perhaps painted the cabinet tiles in the sacristy of the same church, now divided among the Galleria dell'Accademia of Florence and museums in Munich and Berlin. These works show his mastership of Giotto's new style, to which he added a personal experimentation in the architectural backgrounds, such as in the staircase of the Presentation of the Virgin in the Baroncelli Chapel.

According to some scholars, he collaborated in the  Stefaneschi Polyptych in Rome. His other works include a  Madonna in Bern, an Adoration of the Magi in Dijon, the Stories of Job  (Pisa, Camposanto Monumentale), the Madonna Enthroned with Child, Angels and Saints (Florence, Uffizi Gallery), The Stigmatization of Saint Francis (Cambridge, MA,  Harvard Art Museums), the Madonna del Parto (Florence), and the Polyptych in Santa Felicita's sacristy, Florence. Barcelona's MNAC keeps as a permanent loan from the Thyssen-Bornemisza Museum in Madrid a small tempera panel dated in 1325, a Nativity that was part of a larger table.  Vasari credited him also of the design and reconstruction of the Ponte Vecchio, which is however disputed by modern scholars.

He was the father of Agnolo Gaddi and Giovanni Gaddi.

References

Sources

External links

Italian Paintings: Florentine School, a collection catalog containing information about Gaddi and his works (see pages: 22–25).
 

Gothic painters
Trecento painters
1290s births
1366 deaths
Painters from Florence
Fresco painters
Church frescos in Florence
14th-century people of the Republic of Florence
14th-century Italian painters
Italian male painters
Taddeo